Simone Bolelli and Fabio Fognini were the defending champions but Bolelli decided not to participate.
Fognini played alongside Daniele Bracciali but lost in the semifinals.
David Marrero and Fernando Verdasco won the tournament by beating Marcel Granollers and Marc López 6–3, 7–6(7–4) in the final.

Seeds

Draw

Draw

References
 Main Draw

ATP Studena Croatia Open - Doubles
2012 Doubles